Dzungar may refer to:
Dzungar people, Oirat tribes in the Dzungar Khanate
Dzungar Khanate, a historical empire
Jungar Banner, an administrative division of China
Junggar Basin, a geographical region in northwest China